Cundi can refer to:
Cundi, Angola
Cundi, Ethiopia
Cundi (Buddhism)
Cundī Dhāraṇī, a Buddhist mantra in China
Cundi (footballer), real name: Secundino Suárez